Adorno is a surname. 
 Adorno family, Italian noble family of Republic of Genoa, Italy
Notable people with the surname include:
 Aldo Adorno, (born 1982), Paraguayan footballer
 Antoniotto Botta Adorno (1688–1774), high officer of the Habsburg Monarchy and a plenipotentiary of the Austrian Netherlands
 Francis Adorno (1521–1586), celebrated Italian preacher
 Theodor W. Adorno (1903-1969), influential German sociologist and philosopher of the Frankfurt School

References 

Italian-language surnames